Sergey Nikolayevich Armishev (born 29 April 1976) is a Russian former football player who played goalkeeper.

Honours
 Russian Cup finalist: 2001.

External links
 Profile at FC-Ural.ru 
 Russian First Division Squads 2008

1976 births
Sportspeople from Perm, Russia
Living people
FC Ural Yekaterinburg players
PFC CSKA Moscow players
FC Elista players
FC Anzhi Makhachkala players
Russian footballers
Russia under-21 international footballers
Association football goalkeepers
Russian Premier League players
FC Zvezda Perm players